This page features a series of lists of maritime features in the Spratly Islands.

Features by area 
Of the hundreds of maritime features in the Spratly Islands, relatively few have land permanently above sea-level that is larger than protruding rocks. There are only 13 islands and cays with a natural area above sea-level larger than one hectare. With the exception of Swallow Reef, prior to 2014 there had been no large-scale land reclamation beyond building breakwaters and piers, and extending runways.

This changed dramatically in 2014 with the PRC embarking on large-scale reclamations of the lagoons of Johnson South Reef (~10ha) and Fiery Cross Reef (~230ha), and other reclamations of then unknown extent at the Gaven Reefs and Cuarteron Reef. Reports of the extent of land reclaimed on Swallow Reef vary. The PRC land reclamations have continued on a total of seven sites. In 2015, Subi Reef, Hughes Reef and Mischief Reef were added. Refer to the table below for the most recently available data. In summary, there have been reclamations of very large areas (>640 acres = 1 sq mile) at three sites by the PRC, reclamations of large areas (10-100 acres) at eight sites (fourby PRC, three by Vietnam, and one by Malaysia) and reclamations of lesser areas at a number of sites. There does not appear to have been any reclamation of Philippine occupied areas. There have been small Taiwanese reclamations at Itu Aba, very small but functionally significant reclamations at six Malaysian sites, and a number small but significant reclamations at Vietnamese sites in 2016, most particularly at Spratly Island where the runway has been extended and a sheltered harbour added.

The following table contains the 16 largest "natural" features, (i.e. not including reclaimed land), plus the features with significant amounts of reclaimed land:

Features by major reef/bank, etc. 

The boundaries of the Spratly Islands are not firmly defined. West-to-east, the islands range from the coastal waters of Vietnam to the east of Dangerous Ground and the Palawan Passage (approx. 106-117°E), and south-to-north from the coastal waters of Borneo and the southern South China Sea to the north of Dangerous Ground and the Reed Bank (approx. 3-12°N).

The major feature of the area is Dangerous Ground, an oblong area approximately  SW-NE,  at its widest, with an area of about 52,000 nm² (178,000 km²). The remainder of the Spratly Islands are mainly to the west and south of Dangerous Ground, with some features to the east.

The Spratly Islands can be roughly divided into seven sub-areas relative to Dangerous Ground:
 NW of Dangerous Ground (approx. 10-12°N, 113-115°E)
 NE Dangerous Ground    (approx. 10-12°N, 115-117°E)
 SE Dangerous Ground    (approx.  7-10°N, 115-117°E)
 SW Dangerous Ground    (approx.  7-10°N, 113-115°E)
 E of Dangerous Ground  (approx.  3-12°N, east of 117°E)
 S of Dangerous Ground  (approx.  3- 7°N, 113-117°E) and
 W of Dangerous Ground  (approx.  3-12°N, west of 113°E)

Within these sub-areas there are a number of major reefs and banks, as well as ungrouped maritime features.

Starting in the NW, and progressing in a generally SW direction, the features include:

Features by name

Features by occupier and/or claimant

A feature is occupied by a country if one of the following is true:

 Soldiers and/or civilian citizens of a country are present in the feature, either by building structures over the feature to house the citizens (most features are of this type) or by manning a ship anchored over the feature (Philippine-occupied Irving Reef is of this type).
 Regularly visited by soldiers of a country, not necessarily having soldiers present in it 24 hours. These features must lie near (within ) a feature occupied by the country in the way of the first condition. Presence of structures is not necessary. This is the case of Philippine-occupied Flat Island and Lankiam Cay where soldiers stationed at Nanshan Island and Loaita Island respectively, regularly visit on a daily basis.

This makes features occupied by the second condition to be also labeled as "occupied" since they can be guarded far away. However, not all features within the  radius can be considered as absolutely occupied. This is especially true for features that lie between and within  of two or more features occupied by different countries. (See Virtually Occupied or Controlled table)

Summary

Occupied features

Brunei Darussalam 
Note that Louisa Reef was controlled by Brunei since 2009.

Malaysia 
Note that the Royal Malaysian Navy have established 5 Offshore naval stations (Offshore EEZ Stations) on reclaimed land:

 1983: Station Lima (Swallow Reef)
 1986: Station Uniform (Ardasier Reef)
 1986: Station Mike (Mariveles Reef)
 1999: Station Sierra (Erica Reef)
 1999: Station Papa (Investigator Shoal)

People's Republic of China

Republic of China (Taiwan)

Republic of the Philippines

Socialist Republic of Vietnam

Unoccupied but largely controlled by China

Unoccupied but largely controlled by Malaysia

Unoccupied but largely controlled by the Philippines

Unoccupied but largely controlled by Vietnam

Unoccupied features

Claimed features by country but occupied by other country

Others

Notes

References

External links